Echimys vieirai is a spiny rat species from South America, described in 2005. It is found in Brazil.

The species name vieirai is a patronym for the Brazilian mammalogist Carlos Octaviano da Cunha Vieira, curator of the Mammal Collection at the Museum of Zoology of the University of São Paulo (MZUSP), from the early 1940s to 1958.

The main diagnostic trait of this Echimys species is the presence of a dorsal median dark maroon stripe on the head. As compared to Echimys chrysurus, E. vieirai also possesses a darker dorsum.
In addition, E. vieirai can be distinguished from Echimys saturnus by its head clearly darker than the dorsum and a uniformly grayish brown venter, while the dorsal parts of head and body are mostly black and the venter spotted with white in the latter species.

References 

Echimys
Mammals described in 2005
Taxa named by Alexandre Reis Percequillo